Bonded Parallels is a 2009 film written and directed by Armenian filmmaker Hovhannes Galstyan. This film deals with two stories which take place at different times and linked by the birth of the protagonist, the daughter, and the death of the second main character, the mother. The destiny of these two heroines has been influenced by the true story of an Armenian soldier during World War II in Norway and by director's personal history.

Plot
Norway, World War II. Hanna, whose husband Henrik participates in the resistance movement, gives temporary asylum to a prisoner of war, Arakel, by hiding him in her house in northern Norway. The presence of this stranger changes Hanna's life, and she starts writing about her mixed feelings in her diary.

Soviet Union, Armenia, 1988. Laura, 42, a single and fiercely independent math-teacher, lives a quiet and isolated life in Yerevan. It seems that nothing can change her rigidly ordered daily routine until she receives the diary of her mother, who died while giving birth to her. As Laura learns about her parents' story for the first time - a love story of desperation, loss and primal passion - she begins to experience a parallel story of forbidden love in her own life.

Production
The project was developed by the AVANTI Training program for South Caucasus Filmmakers between 2003–2004, implemented by FOCAL and funded by the SDC-Swiss Development Agency. In 2004 a co-production agreement was reached with Hayfilm, the Armenian State studio. The shooting of the Armenian part of the film began in July 2005, until October. 2006 saw a contribution from the Norwegian Film Fund for commencement of shootings in Norway, and a co-production agreement was reached with ORIGINAL FILM AS in July 2006, with the Norwegian part of the shooting beginning the same month.

Further contributions towards the production were received from the Hubert Bals Fund (October 2006), the SDC-Swiss Development Agency (May 2008), the Armenian Ministry of Culture (March 2009), the Norwegian Ministry of Foreign Affairs (May 2009), and Russian distribution company Paradise (May 2009). Production was completed in June 2009.

Festival participation

2009, June, 23	The World premiere in official program of 31st Moscow International Film Festival. Perspectives Competition
2009, July		Golden Apricot IFF, Yerevan, Armenia, International Competition
2009, September	NUR (Pomegranate) International Film Festival, Toronto, Canada, GALA Film and International Competition
2009, November	Promoting Festival-revue of Best Feature Films CIS Countries: CIS: Open Borders, Russian Federation, Ukraine, Armenia, Kazakhstan
2009, November	2nd International Film Festival "East & West, Classics and Avant-garde", Orenburg, Russia, International Competition 
2009, December	International Film Festival "Volokolamsky rubej" (Volokolomsk's boundary), Volokolamsk, Russia, International Competition
2010, February 4–6	The European premiere in 39th International Film Festival Rotterdam, Bright Future program
2010, April	The North American Premiere in REMI AWARDS competition of 43rd Annual WORLDFEST-HOUSTON International Film and Video Festival.
2010, April	Festival of the Best films of GIS Countries in Europe. Prague, Czech Republic.
2010, May	Cannes Film Festival, Market screening.
2010, June	Festival of the Best films of GIS Countries in Europe. Vienna, Austria.
2010, September	13 International Film Festival ARPA, Los Angeles, California USA, International Competition
2010, October	34th São Paulo International Film Festival. International Perspectives.

AWARDS

2009, September	The 2nd Prize for the Best Feature Film. NUR (Pomegranate) International Film Festival, Toronto, Canada.
2009, November	Best Actress Prize. Awarded LAURENCE RITTER for the role LAURA at the 2nd International Film Festival "East & West, Classics and Avant-garde", Orenburg, Russia.
2009, December	Medal of the Ministry of Defense of Russia to Film Director Hovhannes Galstyan for the film "Bonded Parallels" "Volokolamsky rubej" (Volokolomsk's boundary), Volokolamsk, Russia	
2010, April	BEST DRAMATIC FILM – Special Prize Jury of 43rd WORLDFEST-HOUSTON International Film and Video Festival.
2010, September	BEST SCRIPT AWARD. 13 International Film Festival ARPA, L-A, California USA,

Cast
Siri Helene Müller as Hanga
Laurence Ritter as Laura
Sos Janibekyan as Narek
Serge Avedikian as Arakel

External links
 
 Film Festival Rotterdam
 Bonded Parallels at Theiapolis Cinema

2009 films
Armenian drama films
Armenian-language films
2009 drama films
World War II films
Films set in 1988
Films set in Armenia
Films set in Norway